Rukirabasaija Katera was Omukama of the Kingdom of Toro, from 1876 until 1877. He was the ninth (9th) Omukama of Toro.

Claim to the throne
He was the sixth (6th) son of Kasunga Kyebambe Nyaika, Omukama of Toro, from 1866 until 1871 and from 1871 until 1872. No mention is made of his mother. He was raised to the throne by the people of Toro, when his elder brother Kakende Nyamuyonjo failed to return from Buganda in 1876.

Married life
No mention of his married life is made in the available literature.

Offspring
It is not known how many children were fathered by Omukama Isingoma Rukidi II, or who those children were.

His reign
Omukama Katera ruled until 1877 when his elder brother, Rububi Kyebambe II returned to Toro and deposed him in 1877.

The final years
It is not known where and how Omukama Rukidi II died or what the cause of death was.

Succession table

See also
 Omukama of Toro

References

Toro
19th-century rulers in Africa